781 may refer to:

 781 Kartvelia, a minor planet orbiting the Sun
 781 series, a Japanese train type
 781st Bombardment Squadron, a former United States Air Force unit
 Area codes 781 and 339, in the USA
 BOAC Flight 781, a flight which crashed in 1954
 Interstate 781, a highway in the USA